Karl-Friedrich Bonhoeffer (13 January 1899 – 15 May 1957)  was a German chemist.

Education and career 
Born in Breslau, he was an older brother of martyred theologian Dietrich Bonhoeffer. His father was neurologist Karl Bonhoeffer and his mother was Paula von Hase. 

Bonhoeffer studied from 1918 in Tübingen and Berlin, finishing his PhD in 1922 in Berlin with Walther Nernst. From 1923 to 1930 he was an assistant with Fritz Haber at Kaiser Wilhelm Institute for Physical Chemistry and Elektrochemistry in Berlin Dahlem. After the Habilitation in 1927, he became full professor at the University of Berlin. In 1930, Bonhoeffer was appointed a professor of Physical Chemistry at the University of Frankfurt. Four years later, he was appointed a professor of Physical Chemistry at the University of Leipzig. He became a professor for physical chemistry at the University of Berlin in 1947. Bonhoeffer was also director of the Kaiser Wilhelm Institute for physical and electrochemistry (now the Fritz Haber Institute of the MPG).

In 1949, he was appointed director of the Max Planck Institute for Physical Chemistry in Göttingen. The institute was restructured long after his death in 1971 and is now the Max Planck Institute for Biophysical Chemistry in Göttingen, also known as the Karl-Friedrich Bonhoeffer Institute.

Research 
In 1929 Bonhoeffer, together with Paul Harteck, discovered the spin isomers of hydrogen, orthohydrogen and parahydrogen.

He died in Göttingen in 1957 at the age of 58.

References

1899 births
1957 deaths
Scientists from Wrocław
People from the Province of Silesia
20th-century German chemists
Dietrich Bonhoeffer
Members of the German Academy of Sciences at Berlin
Max Planck Institute directors